Rosalind Jane "Roz" Reekie-May formerly Reekie (born 3 February 1972) is a road cyclist from New Zealand.

At the 1992 Summer Olympics at Barcelona she came 49th in the Road Race.

At the 2000 Summer Olympics at Sydney she came 36th in the Road Race.

At the 2002 Commonwealth Games at Montreal she came 5th in the Road Race.

References 
 Black Gold by Ron Palenski (2008, 2004 New Zealand Sports Hall of Fame, Dunedin) p. 77

External links 
 
 
 

1972 births
Living people
New Zealand female cyclists
Olympic cyclists of New Zealand
Cyclists at the 1992 Summer Olympics
Cyclists at the 2000 Summer Olympics
Commonwealth Games competitors for New Zealand
Cyclists at the 2002 Commonwealth Games
Sportspeople from Palmerston North